Janet Irene Sprent, FRSE OBE (born 1934) is a British botanical scientist, and emeritus professor at University of Dundee.

Education and career
After graduating from Imperial College London in 1954 with a BSc and ARCS, Sprent worked for a year at Rothamsted Experimental Station before undertaking a PhD at the University of Tasmania. She taught botany for two years at Rochester Grammar School before being awarded a lectureship at Goldsmiths College in 1960. Sprent moved to Dundee, Scotland in 1967 where she secured a research fellowship at the University of Dundee. She became dean of the Faculty of Science and Engineering in 1987, was awarded a personal chair in 1989 and served as the Head of Department of Biological Sciences from 1992 to 1995. She served as deputy principal of Dundee University from 1995 until her retiral in 1998.

Research areas
Sprent's primary research interests lie in the field of nitrogen fixation in legumes.

Awards and recognition
In recognition of the contribution she has made to the understanding of nitrogen fixation in legume symbioses Sprent was awarded in 1988 with a Doctor of Science degree by the University of London and, in 2006, an honorary Doctor of Agriculture from the Swedish University of Agricultural Sciences. She was inducted as a Fellow of the Royal Society of Edinburgh in 1990 and awarded an OBE in 1996. In 2013, the nitrogen fixing bacterium Burkholderia sprentiae (later renamed Paraburkholderia sprentiae) was named after her. She was awarded Honorary Membership of the British Ecological Society and, in 2021, the Journal of Ecology commissioned its inaugural Sprent Review, a series of annual, commissioned reviews in ecological science, named in honour of her.

Bibliography

References

1934 births
Living people
British botanists
Alumni of Imperial College London
University of Tasmania alumni
Alumni of the University of London
Fellows of the Royal Society of Edinburgh
Officers of the Order of the British Empire
Academics of the University of Dundee
People from Fife